Corneliu Ioan Codreanu (born 11 February 1977) is a Romanian former football right back. Codreanu played in his career mainly for FCM Bacău, but he also spent some periods at teams like: Laminorul Roman, UTA Arad, Aerostar Bacău or Botoşani. In 2011 Codreanu signed with Unirea Mircești, a lower leagues side from Iași County and automatically becoming an important name of the small team. He won afterwards two times Liga IV with Unirea, in 2015 and 2017, but lost in both times the Liga III promotion play-off, in 2015 against Voința Răucești and in 2017 against Oțelul Galați.

Codreanu was badly injured in the left knee in summer of 2003. He was operated in May 2004 at Leverkusen and was out till the end of the year. The German doctor said that the operation made by Romanian doctors was made in mockery.

References

External links
 
 

1977 births
Living people
People from Roman, Romania
Romanian footballers
Association football defenders
Liga I players
Liga II players
CS Aerostar Bacău players
FCM Bacău players
FC UTA Arad players
FC Botoșani players